John J. Coit (1875 – 21 September 1910) was an experienced railroad engineer, who built and operated four miniature railways in California.

Life and work 
John J. Coit worked initially as a master machinist at the Johnson Machine Works but could not continue in this profession because he became physically handicapped. He built and operated several miniature railways in succession:
Seaside Park Railway
Long Beach and Asbury Park Railway
Eastlake Park Scenic Railway
Venice Miniature Railway

The locomotive had some technical innovations, such as a valve control without eccentrics, which was easy to adjust and to maintain. The locomotive had also automatic couplings and a bespoke oil burner, for which Coit filed a patent.

From July 1908 he worked as a locomotive engineer on the main line of the Panama railroad, while the Panama Canal was being built. He was employed by the Atlantic Division, and his residence in the Canal Zone was at Culebra.

Death 
Coit died in an accident in the morning of 21 September 1910 at the age of 35, when the locomotive No 500, with which he pulled a work train, derailed on the main line of the Panama Canal Railway from Gatún to Culebra after colliding with a cow. Coit died immediately at the scene of the accident and his West Indian fireman was seriously injured. The tipped-over locomotive was removed from the tracks to allow other trains to pass.

As Coit was not married, his sister, C.J. Stanton, 418 Solano Avenue, Los Angeles, was the next of kin. His miniature railway locomotive was later used by the Urbita Lake Railway and is still being used on the Billy Jones Wildcat Railroad.

Patents 
 Trolley-pole controller. US 879034 A. 20 October 1906.
 Air-brake mechanism. US 850564 A. 15 November 1906.

References 

1875 births
1910 deaths
Locomotive builders and designers
American railroad mechanical engineers
American inventors
American people in rail transportation
Railway accident deaths